Papa Cristo's is a taverna styled Greek restaurant and market located in the Byzantine-Latino Quarter across the street from Saint Sophia's Church Greek Orthodox Church in Los Angeles, California.

History
Papa Cristo's was founded in October 1948 as an importing and exporting company bringing produce from Greece. The company, which was initially called C & K Importing, was founded by Greek immigrant Sam Chrys. In 1968, Sam Chrys's son Chrys carried on the business and opened a Greek restaurant in addition to the importing business. Chrys eventually traveled across many different parts of Greece in order to attain a better understanding of Greek food and its specialties. In the 1990s, the taverna was opened. The restaurant uses ingredients and foods brought directly from Greece through the importing company. In 1990 the restaurant established a catering service which serves the Great Los Angeles area and Orange County. In 2010 Chrys Chrys' youngest daughter Annie joined the management becoming the third generation of the family to run the business.

Restaurant
The restaurant features a "My Big Fat Greek Family-Style Dinner" every Thursday night which includes various types of entertainment including live bouzouki performances and belly dancing. Due to its popularity, the event is usually sold-out.

The restaurant serves many different types of Greek food and desserts including:
Chicken and lamb Gyros
Souvlaki
Loukaniko
Falafel
Tsipoura
Kefta
Oktapodakia (Grilled Octopus)
Loukoumades
Taramosalata (Greek caviar)
Gigandes plaki

Market
The market includes 3,000 imported goods from Greece such as frappé coffee, olive oil, various ouzo's spanakopita, feta and kasseri cheeses and tiropita. The market also features dozens of selections of imported Greek wine such as Retsina and Muscat from the island of Samos. The market also features many Ethiopian foods and products.

Reception
In 2011 Papa Cristo's was awarded Best Greek Restaurant in Los Angeles by Zagat.

It was considered one of the top 7 family styled restaurants in Los Angeles by ABC 7 news in 2007.

In 2010 Los Angeles Magazine featured Papa Cristo's Roasted Lamb and Feta sandwich as one of the top 17 great sandwiches in Los Angeles.

The food appearing in the 2002 film My Big Fat Greek Wedding and the 2003 CBS TV series My Big Fat Greek Life was provided by Papa Cristo's.

Papa Cristo's was featured in the Los Angeles Times as one of "the most delicious deals you'll find around town."

In June 2020, rapper Ja Rule made a commercial for Papa Cristo's as part of the TBS reality show Celebrity Show-Off. The commercial went viral on social media and helped to bring more business to the restaurant so it wouldn't fall victim to the COVID-19 pandemic.

See also
 List of Greek restaurants

References

External links
Papa Cristo's as featured by the Meat & Potatoes Show of the Food Network Channel (YouTube video)
Cheap Eats TV Los Angeles: Papa Cristos-Greek Food (YouTube video)
Papa Cristos Greek Restaurant on Best Deals TV Show (YouTube video)

California culture
European-American culture in Los Angeles
Restaurants in California
Greek-American culture in California
Greek restaurants in the United States
Restaurants established in 1948